Jack Snow may refer to:

 Jack Snow (writer) (1907–1956), writer of Oz books
 Jack Snow (American football) (1943–2006), American football player
 J. T. Snow (Jack Thomas, born 1968), American baseball player and son of the football player

See also
 John Snow (disambiguation)
 Jon Snow (disambiguation)
 Jack Frost (disambiguation)